Alejandro Camacho (born Alejandro Camacho Pastrana on July 11, 1954) is a Mexican actor and producer.

Filmography

Films

Television

Other works

Awards and nominations

References

External links 

Alejandro Camacho at the Mexica Telenovela Database

1954 births
Living people
Mexican male telenovela actors
Mexican male television actors
Mexican male film actors
Mexican telenovela producers
Male actors from Mexico City
20th-century Mexican male actors
21st-century Mexican male actors
People from Mexico City